TMBThanachart Bank (TTB) is a Thai transactional bank based in Bangkok. It has been listed on the Stock Exchange of Thailand (SET) since 23 December 1983. Piti Tantakasem was appointed CEO effective January 2018.

, TMB is the nation's seventh largest bank with assets of 892 billion baht.

Performance
For the year ending 31 December 2018, TMB reported 48,555 million baht in revenues, income of 11,601 million baht, and total assets of 891,713 million baht. In 2018 TMB reported 8,373 employees, 416 branches, and 2,891 ATMs.

History
TMB was the brainchild of Field Marshall Sarit Thanarat. He endeavoured to establish a commercial banking business to provide financial services exclusively to military personnel under the Commercial Banking Act B.E. 2488 (1945). The bank started in 1957, but only opened its first branch, Rajaprasong Branch, in Bangkok in 1963. In 1973 it became a full commercial bank with the general public as its customer base. It adopted the slogan, "Thai Military Bank, the Bank for all people". In 2005, TMB adopted the new official name in English, "TMB Bank Public Company Limited", the present-day corporate logo, and a new slogan, "Better Partner, Better Value".

TMBThanachart Bank

In 2019, TMB Bank agreed to merge with Thanachart Bank, a retail bank in Thailand, which would make TMBThanachart the sixth largest bank in Thailand. The merger is expected to be completed in 2021. Initially, TMBThanachart will have 91 branches, 58 in Bangkok and 33 in the provinces. Praphan Anupongongarch is President of TMBThanachart Bank.

Slogan
ttb bank has adopted "Make REAL Change" as its corporate philosophy. Doing the same thing and the same way will always yield the same results. As ttb’s goal is to improve financial well-being for Thai people, the core foundation of financial freedom, ttb, as a bank, need to change.

Corporate social responsibility program
ttb set up FAI-FAH as its main corporate social responsibility programme. FAI-FAH is a learning centre where free courses in cooking, painting, singing, dancing and other subjects are offered to low-income teenagers. Currently there are two FAI-FAH centres. Many of the children who have been trained by the center have return to their communities and initiated community development programme aided by ttb staffers who work as volunteers.

Awards and recognition
On 14 April 2015, The Asian Banker Leadership Achievement Awards presented the "Best CEO in Asia Pacific 2015" award to Boontuck Wungcharoen, TMB CEO, and the "Best Managed Bank in Asia Pacific" award to TMB. The award ceremony took place during the Asian Banker Summit in Hong Kong. Both Boontuck and TMB are the first from Thailand to receive the accolade.

In its announcement of the awards, the Asian Banker said, "...the bank has changed from a loss-making institution to a profitable one. Its net profit in 2014 rose by 66.2%—the highest among Thai banks. Net profit improved five-fold from, 2009-2014 while asset quality improved. Non-performing loan ratios dropped from 12.7% in 2009 to 2.9% in 2014 and cost-to-income ratios decreased from 77% in 2009 to 53% in 2014."

Mr. Boontuck was also named "Financier of the Year 2014" by Money and Banking magazine.

Shareholders
Major shareholders as of 2 December 2019:
 ING Bank N.V.: 26.06%
 Thai Ministry of Finance: 15.95%
 Thai NDVR: 12.31%
 Royal Thai Army: 0.77%

Management
Key management as of 1 March 2020:
 Mr. Piti Tantakasem, Chief Executive Officer
 Mr. Praphan Anupongongarch, President
 Mrs. Prapasiri Kositthanakorn, Chief Financial Officer

Notes

References

Banks of Thailand
Thai Royal Warrant holders
Banks established in 1957
Companies listed on the Stock Exchange of Thailand
1957 establishments in Thailand
Companies based in Bangkok